Rewilding means to return to a more wild or natural state; it is the process of undoing domestication. The term emerged from green anarchism and anarcho-primitivism. The central argument is that the majority of humans have been "civilized" or "domesticated" by agrarianism and sedentary social stratification. Such a process is compared to how dogs have been domesticated from what was a common ancestor with wolves, resulting in a loss in health and vibrancy. Supporters of rewilding argue that through the process of domestication, human wildness has been altered by force.

Rewilding encourages the conscious undoing of human domestication and returning to the lifeways of hunter-gatherer cultures. Though often associated with primitive skills and learning knowledge of wild plants and animals, it emphasizes regenerative land management techniques employed by hunter-gatherers and horticulturalists, as well as development of the senses and fostering deepening personal relationships with members of other species and the natural world. Rewilding intends to create permanently wild human cultures beyond domestication.

Rewilding is considered a holistic approach to living, as opposed to specific or separate skills, practices or knowledges.

Rewilding is most associated with green anarchy and anarcho-primitivism or anti-civilization and post-civilization anarchism in general.

See also 
 Lifestyle disease
 Diseases of affluence
 Pleistocene Rewilding
 Green Anarchist
 Hemeroby
 Species Traitor
 The World Without Us
 Feral: Searching for Enchantment on the Frontiers of Rewilding
 Self-domestication § Modern Humans

References

External links 
Rewild Portland
ReWild University
"A Primitivist Primer"
Re-Wilding
The Rewilding Institute
Stozenburg, William. Where the Wild Things Were. Conservation in Practice 7(1):28-34.
How Human Rewilding Works

Anarcho-primitivism
Anarchist theory
Ecology
Green anarchism